TriMedia may refer to:

 TriMedia (mediaprocessor), a media processor made by Philips/NXP Semiconductors
 Trimedia International, a European public-relations agency
 Trimedia, a planthopper in subfamily Dictyopharinae

Similarly named pages:
 Trymedia, a digital distribution company